Club Deportivo Universidad Católica is a football club based in Santiago, Chile.

Club Deportivo Universidad Católica may also refer to:

Club Deportivo Universidad Católica (multi-sports club), parent organization of the Chilean football club
Club Deportivo Universidad Católica del Ecuador, a football club based in Quito, Ecuador

See also
Universidad Católica (disambiguation)